The Amite County School District (ACSD) is a public school district based in Liberty, Mississippi (USA). The district's boundaries parallel that of Amite County. In addition to Liberty, the district includes Gloster and the Amite County portions of Centreville and Crosby.

Schools
Amite County High School (Liberty; Grades 9-12)
Amite Elementary School (Liberty; Grades K-8)
Amite County Vocational And Technical Complex (Liberty; Grades 10-12)

Demographics

2006-07 school year
There were a total of 1,309 students enrolled in the Amite County School District during the 2006–2007 school year. The gender makeup of the district was 49% female and 51% male. The racial makeup of the district was 84.26% African American, 15.13% White, 0.53% Hispanic, and 0.08% Native American. All of the district's students were eligible to receive free lunch.

Previous school years

Accountability statistics

See also
List of school districts in Mississippi

References

External links

Education in Amite County, Mississippi
School districts in Mississippi